The 2012 USA Sevens Collegiate Rugby Championship was a rugby union sevens tournament. The tournament was held on June 2–3 at PPL Park in Chester, Pennsylvania.  It was the third annual Collegiate Rugby Championship, and the second year in a row that the tournament was held at PPL Park.  Sixteen teams from colleges in the United States competed. Dartmouth College defeated Arizona in the final to secure their second CRC Championship in a row.

Pool stage

Pool A 
{| class="wikitable" style="text-align: center;"
|-
!width="200"|Team
!width="40"|Pld
!width="40"|W
!width="40"|D
!width="40"|L
!width="40"|PF
!width="40"|PA
!width="40"|+/-
!width="40"|Pts
|- bgcolor=ccffcc
|align=left| Life
|3||3||0||0||88||36||+52||9
|- bgcolor=ccffcc
|align=left| Wisconsin
|3||1||1||1||43||63||-20||6
|- 
|align=left| Penn State
|3||1||0||2||68||45||+23||5
|-
|align=left| Temple
|3||0||1||2||26||81||-55||4
|}

The teams from Group A collectively were 1-5 on day 2 in the knockout round.

Pool B 
{| class="wikitable" style="text-align: center;"
|-
!width="200"|Team
!width="40"|Pld
!width="40"|W
!width="40"|D
!width="40"|L
!width="40"|PF
!width="40"|PA
!width="40"|+/-
!width="40"|Pts
|- bgcolor=ccffcc
|align=left| Dartmouth
|3||3||0||0||90||12||+78||9
|- bgcolor=ccffcc
|align=left| Delaware
|3||2||0||1||60||55||+5||7
|-
|align=left| Florida
|3||1||0||2||29||52||-23||5
|-
|align=left| Maryland
|3||0||0||3||28||88||-60||3
|}

The teams from Group B collectively were 8-2 on day 2 in the knockout round.

Pool C 

{| class="wikitable" style="text-align: center;"
|-
!width="200"|Team
!width="40"|Pld
!width="40"|W
!width="40"|D
!width="40"|L
!width="40"|PF
!width="40"|PA
!width="40"|+/-
!width="40"|Pts
|- bgcolor=ccffcc
|align=left| Arizona
|3||3||0||0||104||19||+85||9
|- bgcolor=ccffcc
|align=left| Texas
|3||2||0||1||52||66||-14||7
|-
|align=left| Oklahoma
|3||1||0||2||52||71||-19||5
|-
|align=left| North Carolina State
|3||0||0||3||24||69||-45||3
|}

The teams from Group C collectively were 4-4 on day 2 in the knockout round.

Pool D 

{| class="wikitable" style="text-align: center;"
|-
!width="200"|Team
!width="40"|Pld
!width="40"|W
!width="40"|D
!width="40"|L
!width="40"|PF
!width="40"|PA
!width="40"|+/-
!width="40"|Pts
|- bgcolor=ccffcc
|align=left| California
|3||3||0||0||79||15||+64||9
|- bgcolor=ccffcc
|align=left| Navy
|3||2||0||1||63||50||+13||7
|- 
|align=left| Army
|3||1||0||2||29||68||-39||5
|-
|align=left| Notre Dame
|3||0||0||3||20||58||-38||3
|}

The teams from Group D collectively were 2-4 on day 2 in the knockout round.

Knockout stage

Championship Bracket

Challenger Bracket

Players 
The following 12 players were selected by Rugby Mag as members of the All-Tournament team:

 Peter Tiberio - Arizona
 Brett Thompson - Arizona
 Cam Dolan - Life University
 Madison Hughes - Dartmouth
 Trevor Tanifum - Maryland
 Seamus Siefring - Navy
 Bobby Impson - Oklahoma
 Eric Luikens - Texas
 Nate Brakeley - Dartmouth
 Derek Fish - Dartmouth
 Brad Harrington - Cal
 Paul Bosco - Cal

Leading Scorers

References

External links
 USA Sevens Collegiate Rugby Championship

2012
2012 rugby union tournaments for clubs
2012 in American rugby union
2012 rugby sevens competitions